Imboden is a German surname; it is translated "someone living on the valley bottom", derived from Middle High German bodem boden, meaning "floor bottom ground". Notable people with the surname include:

Connie Imboden (fl. 1987–present), American photographer
Facundo Imboden (born 1980), Argentine footballer
Francisca Imboden (born 1972), Chilean film, theater and television actress
John D. Imboden (1823–1895), American lawyer, Virginia state legislator and Confederate army general
Race Imboden (born 1993), American foil fencer and menswear fashion model
Tris Imboden (born 1951), American rock and jazz drummer
Urs Imboden (born 1975), Swiss alpine skier

Reference 

German-language surnames